The 2016 Women's World Ice Hockey Championships were the 18th such series of tournaments organised by the International Ice Hockey Federation. Teams participated at several levels of competition. These tournaments also served as qualifications for the 2017 competition and finalized seeding for the 2018 Winter Olympics qualification.

Championship (Top Division)

The Top Division tournament was played in Kamloops, British Columbia, Canada, from 28 March to 4 April 2016.

Division I

Division I Group A
The Division I Group A tournament was played in Aalborg, Denmark, from 25 to 31 March 2016.

Division I Group B
The Division I Group B tournament was played in Asiago, Italy, from 4 to 10 April 2016.

Division II

Division II Group A
The Division II Group A tournament was played in Bled, Slovenia, from 2 to 8 April 2016.

Division II Group B
The Division II Group B tournament was played in Jaca, Spain, from 29 February to 6 March 2016.

Division II Group B Qualification
The Division II Group B Qualification tournament was played in Sofia, Bulgaria, from 7 to 10 December 2015.

References

External links
Official website of IIHF

 
World Ice Hockey Championships - Women's
IIHF Women's World Ice Hockey Championships